The canton of Lunéville-1 is an administrative division of the Meurthe-et-Moselle department, northeastern France. It was created at the French canton reorganisation which came into effect in March 2015. Its seat is in Lunéville.

It consists of the following communes:

Anthelupt
Bauzemont
Bienville-la-Petite
Bonviller
Courbesseaux
Crévic
Crion
Croismare
Deuxville
Dombasle-sur-Meurthe
Drouville
Einville-au-Jard
Flainval
Hénaménil
Hoéville
Hudiviller
Jolivet
Lunéville (partly)
Maixe
Raville-sur-Sânon
Serres
Sionviller
Sommerviller
Valhey
Varangéville
Vitrimont

References

Cantons of Meurthe-et-Moselle